XHRST-FM is a station located in Tijuana, Baja California, Mexico. It transmits for Tijuana and San Diego on 107.7 MHz and is currently operated by MLC Media, a Spanish-language radio syndicator based in the United States, as "Más Flo" with a Latin urban format.

History
The history of XHRST begins on 91.9 MHz in Rosarito, but the station promptly moved to 107.7 MHz. After Rosarito became a separate municipality, the station moved its studios to Tijuana on Blvd. Sánchez Taboada in the Zona Río and took on ACIR's Digital contemporary hit radio format.

On May 11, 2009, GRI Radio brought the Los 40 format to Tijuana on XHRST. On October 13, 2009, Ya Párate, the Los 40 morning show, originated from Tijuana for the network. Grupo Audiorama jettisoned all Televisa Radio formats, including Los 40, at the end of June 2017, and it instituted  in Tijuana on July 17, 2017. The format lasted almost a full year until the station returned to Spanish CHR on July 9, 2018. On August 8, Grupo Audiorama returned the Los 40 format to the Tijuana and San Diego market.

On December 1, 2020, MLC Media took over operations of XHRST-FM by dropping the Los 40 format and instituting the Más Flo format that ran on XHLNC-FM 104.9 under its management between December 2019 and April 2020; MLC had bowed out of that arrangement, citing XHLNC's social concession.

References

1994 establishments in Mexico
Radio stations established in 1994
Radio stations in Tijuana
Reggaeton radio stations